Robert White was  an English Anglican priest in the 17th century.

Stokes was  educated Sidney Sussex College, Cambridge and incorporated at Oxford in 1606. He became Archdeacon of Merioneth in 1623 and Archdeacon of Norfolk  in 1631.

Notes

17th-century English Anglican priests
Archdeacons of Merioneth
Archdeacons of Norfolk
Alumni of Sidney Sussex College, Cambridge
Alumni of the University of Oxford